The Joint Services School for Linguists (JSSL) was founded in 1951 by the British armed services to provide language training, principally in Russian, and largely to selected conscripts undergoing National Service. The school closed with the ending of conscription in 1960, after which the services made their own provisions as they had prior to the opening of the school (and, to some extent, even during its operation).

The founding of the school was prompted by the need to provide greater numbers of interpreters, intelligence and signals intelligence officers due to the Cold War, and the Korean War which had started the previous year.

Training and accommodation locations

Two of the school's sites — at Walker Lines, Bodmin, Cornwall, and Coulsdon, near Croydon - opened in September 1951.  The Coulsdon site closed in 1954, and Bodmin in 1956.

For a time in the early 1960s the school (renamed the Joint Services School for Linguists) was based at RAF Tangmere near Chichester in Sussex, where Mandarin, Polish and Czech in addition to Russian were taught.

Training system
The JSSL system was rigorous. It pioneered the application of intensive language training techniques which involved eight hours a day, five days a week staff-student contact, with regular after-hours homework. Lectures on the formalities of basic Russian grammar were followed by practical small-group tutorials which made frequent use of timed dictation exercises (диктовка). The later courses also pioneered the use of tape-recorders. A special 'JSSL Training Manual' was compiled and systematically employed in classes. In addition, lengthy vocabulary lists were issued and tough weekly tests set. Two consecutive fails could mean expulsion from the course. However, fails were surprisingly uncommon, perhaps because failed students were immediately posted to less desirable duties and locations.

Selection criteria

Teaching staff

Russian tutors tended to be a mixture of White Russian émigrés and carefully vetted Soviet defectors. Among them were some odd and colourful figures, including an aged, wooden-legged "colonel of cavalry" who claimed to have lost his leg while fighting against the Reds in the Russian Civil war. Another, a mysterious 'Countess', always dressed from head to toe in black, "in permanent mourning' for the tsar and his family". One set of statistics from Bodmin listed the teaching staff as comprising:

Probably the most important member of the teaching staff was Professor (later Dame) Elizabeth Hill, who was director of the JSSL through its period of existence.

Non-training staff

Syllabus and training tools

One major teaching tool was the Anna H Semeonoff Grammar textbook, informally known as  Semyonova.  Other teaching materials included comprehensive vocabulary lists, a reading primer called Ordinary People, and a textbook by Pears and Wissotsky's titled Passages for Translation.  Literature published in Russian, such as Crime And Punishment, was also used.

Assessment systems

The attraction of avoiding normal military training and threat of being "returned to unit" if the weekly test was failed tended to make for attentive students. Students who successfully completed the JSSL course had the option of taking the GCE examination in Russian at 'A' level. Many did so.

Alumni and legacy

Aside from their military contribution, many of the estimated 6,000 trainees continued to use their skills in their subsequent civilian life in translation, business, education and cultural life. Notable alumni of the school include former Governor of the Bank of England Eddie George, playwright and novelist Michael Frayn, actor and writer Alan Bennett, dramatist Dennis Potter, and former director of the Royal National Theatre Sir Peter Hall. The Soviet spy Geoffrey Prime was also a graduate of JSSL at Crail.  The industrialist John Harvey-Jones graduated from an early version of the JSSL course in 1945, during the period it was run from Cambridge.

Another alumnus, D. M. Thomas, has argued that as well as the school's stated aim of producing linguists for a military purpose, it also 'created a generation of young and influential Britons who had generous, respectful and affectionate feelings for Russia — the eternal Russia of Tolstoy, Pushkin and Pasternak'.

Several alumni went on to successful careers in academia. These include John Fennell (Professor of Russian, University of Oxford), Tony Stokes (Professor of Russian, University of Cambridge), Gerry Smith (Professor of Russian, University of Oxford). Ronald Hingley, who ran the London branch of the JSSL, went on to a successful career at the University of Oxford and became an authority on Anton Chekhov. Paul Foote became a Fellow of Queen's College, Oxford, and an authority on eighteenth century Russia.

Extent of interest in the JSSL by the Warsaw Pact

For various reasons, the JSSL attracted significant interest from Soviet intelligence. There is, however, no evidence that the School as an organisation or any of its students was ever successfully penetrated by Soviet intelligence. Even so, in the late 1950s, the SIS was so sensitive about security at the JSSL that they pursued a young Royal Navy cadet who, in a published article, had publicly revealed some minor inside information about the work done there: in what was seen by many at the time as a gross overreaction, he was charged and convicted under the Official Secrets Act and, as a result, spent time in prison. Subsequently, security files were opened on everyone, staff and students who had passed through a JSSL course.

See also
British military history
Defense Language Institute
Intelligence (information gathering)

Notes

References
 Elliott, Geoffrey, & Shukman, Harold. Secret Classrooms: An Untold Story of the Cold War, St Ermin's Press, 2003.

Further reading
 Boiling, Graham. Secret Students on Parade: Cold War Memories of JSSL, CRAIL, PlaneTree, 2005. 
 Woodhead, Leslie. My life as a spy, Macmillan, 2005. 

Military training establishments of the United Kingdom
Military of the United Kingdom in Cornwall
1951 establishments in the United Kingdom
Language education in the United Kingdom